Fatuha Assembly constituency is one of 243 constituencies of legislative assembly of Bihar. It comes under Patna Sahib Lok Sabha constituency.

Overview
Fatuha comprises CD Blocks Fatuha & Sampatchak; Gram Panchayats Marchi, Mahuli, Fatehpur, Sonwan, Punadih & Sabalpur of Patna Rural CD Block.

Members of Legislative Assembly

Election results

2020

2015

2010

See also
 List of Assembly constituencies of Bihar
 Fatuha

References

External links
 

Assembly constituencies in Patna district
Politics of Patna district
Assembly constituencies of Bihar